Luckey Quarter is a short story by American writer Stephen King. It was originally published in the June 30/July 2, 1995 issue of USA Weekend. In 1997, it was published in the limited-edition collection Six Stories. In 2002, it was collected in King's collection Everything's Eventual.

Plot summary
Darlene Pullen, who is a struggling single mother with two children (a rebellious teenage daughter and a sickly young son) and an unfulfilling job as a maid, is left a tip of a single quarter with a note saying that it is a "luckey [lucky] quarter". She takes a quick gamble on it and finds that it brings her some small luck. Moving on to a real casino, she keeps trying her luck, and soon she's winning thousands of dollars. All seems to be going exceedingly well until she suddenly reappears back in the hotel room, left with nothing but her lucky quarter. All of her success was a fantasy. As her two children come to visit her at work, she lets her son have the quarter, and as he uses it in a gamble, it starts to pay off just as it did when Darlene was fantasizing.

See also
 Stephen King short fiction bibliography

External links
Stephen King Short Movies
 

1997 short stories
Short stories by Stephen King
Works originally published in USA Weekend